Apanhador Só is a Brazilian rock band formed in 2003 by Alexandre Kumpinski (vocals and guitar), Felipe Zancanaro (guitar) and Fernão Agra (bass guitar).

Members

Current members 

 Alexandre Kumpinski - vocals and guitar
 Felipe Zancanaro guitar
 Fernão Agra - bass guitar

Discography

Studio albums 

 2010: "Apanhador Só"
 2013: "Antes Que Tu Conte Outra"
 2017: "Meio que tudo é um"

EPs 
2006 - "Embrulho pra levar"
 2012 - "Paraquedas"

Live albums 
2011 - "Acústico-Sucateiro"

Musical quartets
Musical groups from Rio Grande do Sul
Brazilian rock music groups
Brazilian alternative rock groups
Brazilian indie rock groups
Brazilian experimental rock groups
Musical groups established in 2005
Musical groups established in the 2000s
2005 establishments in Brazil